Ataur Rahman is a Bangladeshi stage and television actor.

Ataur Rahman (Arabic: عطا الرحمن) may also refer to:

 Ataur Rahman (poet), Bangladeshi poet
 Ataur Rahman (Bangladeshi politician), Bangladeshi politician

See also 
 Ata-ur-Rahman (disambiguation)